Yinas is the name of an abandoned mountainous settlement in Ras Al Khaimah, United Arab Emirates (UAE).

References

Villages in the United Arab Emirates
Populated places in the Emirate of Ras Al Khaimah